Aksbandh (previously Paranormal Karachi Nights) is a supernatural found footage horror film released in 2016, the first film of its kind from Pakistan. It was produced, written, and directed by Emran Hussain and co-written by Ayaz Samoo. Aksbandh was produced under the production banner of Cinematic Media and Big Idea Entertainment. The film features an assembled cast that includes Ayaz Samoo, Saud Imtiaz, Danial Afzal, Bilal Yousufzai, Shehzeen Rahat, Mahrukh Rizvi, and Arshad Ali.

The film was distributed by Hum Films on 20 May 2016 in cinemas nationwide.

Plot

The plot of movie resolves around six friends who set out on a fun adventure trip to Drigh Lake in Larkana, to make a small budget horror film. However, when the trip takes a nasty turn, the six friends find themselves mixed up in paranormal activities.

Cast
 Ayaz Samoo as Sunny
 Danial Afzal Khan as Ayaan
 Saud Imtiaz as Shehzad
 Shehzeen Rahat as Sadia
 Bilal Yousufzai as Raheel
 Mahrukh Rizvi as Aaliya
 Arshad Ali as Chacha

Production
Aksbandh was completely shot and produced in Pakistan, except for sound recording and mixing, which was done in India.

Marketing and release
A teaser trailer for Aksbandh was revealed on 15 November 2015. The theatrical trailer and final poster for the film was released on 23 April 2016. The film was released across Pakistani cinemas on 20 May 2016.

See also
List of Pakistani films of 2016

References

External links
 
 

2016 films
2010s Urdu-language films
Pakistani horror films
Found footage films
2016 horror films
Pakistani mystery films
Pakistani supernatural films